Jean Chevrier (25 April 1915 – 13 December 1975) was a French film actor and member of the Comédie-Française. He appeared in 50 films between 1936 and 1972. He was married to actress Marie Bell. At the end of his life, he was known as Jean-Claude Pascal's lover. He was buried alongside his wife at the Monaco Cemetery in Monaco.

Partial filmography

 Mademoiselle ma mère (1937) - Un gigolo
 Liberté (1938)
 Three from St Cyr (1939) - Pierre Mercier
 Grand-père (1939) - Gérard Bréval
 The Emigrant (1940) - François Champart
 The Last of the Six (1941) - Jean Perlonjour
 La prière aux étoiles (1941) - Dominique de Ravel
 Andorra ou les hommes d'Airain (1942) - Angelo Xiriball
 The Murderer is Afraid at Night (1942) - Olivier Rol
 La grande marnière (1943) - Pascal Carvajan
 La sévillane (1943) - Rafaelito
 Tornavara (1943) - Gérard Morhange
 Love Around the Clock (1943) - Le condamné
 Paris Frills (1945) - Daniel Rousseau
 L'ange qu'on m'a donné (1946) - François Lemaresquier
 Messieurs Ludovic (1946) - Ludovic Mareuil
 The Mysterious Monsieur Sylvain (1947) - Chantenay
 Woman of Evil (1947) - Diego
 The Ironmaster (1948) - Philippe Derblay
 To the Eyes of Memory (1948) - Le commandant Pierre Aubry
 Le droit de l'enfant (1949) - Jacques Herbelin
 La voix du rêve (1949) - Le docteur Rameau
 L'escadron blanc (1949) - Le capitaine Marsay
 Women and Brigands (1950) - Generale Hugo
 Messalina (1951) - Valerio / Valerius Asiaticus
 The House on the Dune (1952) - L'inspecteur des douanes Lourges
 Je l'ai été trois fois (1952) - Man in front of the hotel (uncredited)
 The Long Teeth (1953) - Walter - le rédacteur en chef
 Endless Horizons (1953) - André Danet
 Royal Affairs in Versailles (1954) - Turenne
 The Big Flag (1954) -Jean Favrel
 The Courier of Moncenisio (1956) - Colonnello napoleonico
 Napoléon (1955) - Le général Duroc
 Men in White (1955) - Dr. Legendre
 Le couteau sous la gorge (1955) - Pacos le Maltais
 Ce soir les jupons volent (1956) - Pierre Roussel
 The Three Musketeers (1959, TV Movie) - Athos
 The Gigolo (1960) - Doctor Dampier
 Amazons of Rome (1961) - Porcenna - Etruscan Leader
 Le captif (1962) - Hamelin
 Phèdre (1968) - Théramène

References

External links

1915 births
1975 deaths
French male film actors
Sociétaires of the Comédie-Française
20th-century French male actors
Bisexual male actors
20th-century French LGBT people